Jefferson City National Cemetery is a United States National Cemetery located in Jefferson City, in Cole County, Missouri. Administered by the United States Department of Veterans Affairs, it encompasses , and as of the end of 2005, had 1,792 interments. It is administered by Jefferson Barracks National Cemetery.

History 
The first interments took place in Jefferson City National Cemetery in 1861, and were American Civil War soldiers who died in the skirmishes that took place in the region. Though, the area did not see any wide-scale combat, it was officially designated a National Cemetery in 1867.

Jefferson City National Cemetery was listed on the National Register of Historic Places on October 1, 1998.

Noteworthy monuments 
The 39th Regiment Monument of Centralia, Missouri, erected circa 1968 to commemorate those members of the Missouri Volunteer Infantry who died at the hands of William T. Anderson's bushwhacker forces in the Centralia Massacre (Missouri).

References

External links
 National Cemetery Administration
 Jefferson City National Cemetery
 
 
 

Second Empire architecture in Missouri
Neoclassical architecture in Missouri
Buildings and structures in Jefferson City, Missouri
United States national cemeteries
Missouri in the American Civil War
Cemeteries on the National Register of Historic Places in Missouri
Historic American Landscapes Survey in Missouri
Protected areas of Cole County, Missouri
Tourist attractions in Jefferson City, Missouri
National Register of Historic Places in Cole County, Missouri